In French honorary citizenship is awarded by cities, towns and sometimes federal states.

During the French Revolution, France granted honorary French citizenship to those deemed champions of the cause. However, not all were sympathizers with the Revolution.  One (Cloots) died on the guillotine.

Joel Barlow
Ludwig van Beethoven
Jeremy Bentham
Robert Burns
Joachim Heinrich Campe
Thomas Clarkson
Anacharsis Cloots
Cornelius de Pauw
Giuseppe Gorani
Alexander Hamilton
Friedrich Gottlieb Klopstock
Tadeusz Kościuszko
James Mackintosh
James Madison
Thomas Muir
Thomas Paine
Johann Heinrich Pestalozzi
Joseph Priestley
Friedrich Schiller
George Washington
William Wilberforce
David Williams

References

France
French citizenship during the French Revolution
Citizenship during the French Revolution
French nationality law
French Revolution